Keith Aaron Null (born September 24, 1985) is a former American football quarterback. He was drafted by the St. Louis Rams in the 2009 NFL Draft. He played college football at West Texas A&M. Null was also a member of the Jacksonville Jaguars and Carolina Panthers.

College career
Null started in two seasons for West Texas A&M, throwing for over 9,000 yards in his two seasons as a starter. He was awarded All-Conference honors as a junior and senior. As a junior, Null threw for 4,134 yards with 41 touchdowns and 14 interceptions, including a 498-yard, six-touchdown outburst against Washburn. After settling in as a junior, Null exploded for one of the most prolific passing seasons at any collegiate level as a senior. He finished the season with 5,097 yards and 48 touchdowns with 15 interceptions.

Professional career

St. Louis Rams
Null was drafted by the St. Louis Rams in the 6th round of the 2009 NFL Draft. In week 14, he made his first professional start, filling in for the injured Marc Bulger and Kyle Boller.
In his first regular season start Keith completed 27 of 43 passes and threw for one touchdown and five interceptions in a 47-7 loss to the Tennessee Titans.

Null was cut by the St. Louis Rams before the 2010 regular season campaign began.

Jacksonville Jaguars
Null was signed to the Jacksonville Jaguars' practice squad on September 27, 2010. He was released on September 30.

Carolina Panthers
Null joined the Carolina Panthers' practice squad on November 23, 2010. He was called up to the active roster December 3 following a season-ending injury to Tony Pike.

Statistics

Source:

Personal life
Null is currently the Campus Pastor at Renew Life Church in Lubbock, Texas where he lives with his wife and three children.  In 2014, he began to coach football to area kids at the Keith Null Quarterback and Receiver Mini Camp.

References

External links
 St. Louis Rams bio 

1985 births
Living people
People from Lampasas, Texas
Players of American football from Texas
American football quarterbacks
West Texas A&M Buffaloes football players
St. Louis Rams players
Jacksonville Jaguars players
Carolina Panthers players